Railly may refer to:

Kathryn Railly, character in 12 Monkeys
Cassie Railly, character in 12 Monkeys (TV series)

See also
Reilly (surname)